Helen Victoria Danesh-Meyer  is a New Zealand ophthalmology academic, and as of 2018 is a full professor at the University of Auckland.

Academic career
After an undergraduate at the University of Otago followed by a 2004 MD titled  'The evaluation of diagnostic procedures, visual outcome and optic nerve morphology in giant cell arteritis'  and a 2013 PhD titled  'Evaluation of optic nerve morphology in non-glaucomatous optic neuropathies with quantitative optic nerve imaging modalities'  at the University of Auckland, Danesh-Meyer joined the staff at Auckland, rising to full professor.

Much of Danesh-Meyer's profile is due to her work on glaucoma.

Honours
In the 2023 New Year Honours, Danesh-Meyer was appointed a Companion of the New Zealand Order of Merit (CNZM), for services to ophthalmology.

Selected works 
 Danesh-Meyer, H. V., H. Birch, JY-F. Ku, Stuart Carroll, and Gregory Gamble. "Reduction of optic nerve fibers in patients with Alzheimer disease identified by laser imaging." Neurology 67, no. 10 (2006): 1852–1854.
 Danesh-Meyer, Helen V., Taras Papchenko, Peter J. Savino, Andrew Law, James Evans, and Greg D. Gamble. "In vivo retinal nerve fiber layer thickness measured by optical coherence tomography predicts visual recovery after surgery for parachiasmal tumors." Investigative ophthalmology & visual science 49, no. 5 (2008): 1879–1885.
 Danesh-Meyer, Helen V. "Radiation-induced optic neuropathy." Journal of Clinical Neuroscience 15, no. 2 (2008): 95–100.
 Danesh-Meyer, Helen V. "Neuroprotection in glaucoma: recent and future directions." Current opinion in ophthalmology 22, no. 2 (2011): 78–86.
 Danesh-Meyer, Helen V., Peter J. Savino, and Robert C. Sergott. "Ocular and cerebral ischemia following facial injection of autologous fat." Archives of Ophthalmology 119, no. 5 (2001): 777–778.
 Danesh-Meyer, Helen V., Peter J. Savino, and Robert C. Sergott. "The prevalence of cupping in end-stage arteritic and nonarteritic anterior ischemic optic neuropathy." Ophthalmology 108, no. 3 (2001): 593–598.

References

External links
 

Living people
New Zealand women academics
Year of birth missing (living people)
New Zealand ophthalmologists
University of Otago alumni
University of Auckland alumni
Academic staff of the University of Auckland
New Zealand medical researchers
New Zealand women writers
Companions of the New Zealand Order of Merit